Taxation in the Faroe Islands has differed from the taxes in Denmark since home rule was granted in 1948. This gives the Faroe Islands control over their own taxes.

Income taxation

All citizens of the Faroe Islands are subject to personal taxation. The government tax rate on incomes up to DKK 500,000 is 20%. Incomes higher than this pay a fixed amount, always resulting in a higher percentage. There are multiple tax deductions in the Faroes. This includes a 14% deduction for fishermen. However, this is limited to 14% of DKK 470,000 corresponding to a maximum annual deduction of DKK 65,800. A deduction for foreign workers also exists, and this deduction can be as high as 30%. Deductions are also available to students and parents.

VAT and business taxes

The VAT or Value Added Tax, is a tax on imports and sales paid to the Faroese treasury. The VAT is deductible for income purposes. Companies that don't pay a VAT must pay an employer's tax. The corporate tax rate in the Faroe Islands stands at 18%.

Tax administration

Citizens subject to taxation use the calendar year as the income tax/fiscal year. Generally, the income period for companies follows the accounting year, which has to be no longer than 12 months. However, the first accounting year can vary from 6 to 18 months.

References

Economy of the Faroe Islands
Faroe Islands